The men's singles competition of the table tennis events at the 2015 Southeast Asian Games is being held from 1 to 4 June at the Singapore Indoor Stadium in Singapore.

Schedule

Results

Preliminary round

Group A

Group B

Group C

Group D

Knockout round

Semifinals

Gold-medal match

References

External links
 

Men's singles